The 1924 Kansas gubernatorial election was held on November 4, 1924. Republican nominee Benjamin S. Paulen defeated Democratic incumbent Jonathan M. Davis with 49.02% of the vote.

General election

Candidates
Major party candidates 
Benjamin S. Paulen, Republican
Jonathan M. Davis, Democratic

Other candidates
William Allen White, Independent
M. L. Phillips, Socialist

Results

References

1924
Kansas
Gubernatorial